Vinayak K. Prasad is an American hematologist-oncologist and health researcher. He is a professor of Epidemiology and Biostatistics at the University of California, San Francisco (UCSF). He is the author of the books Ending Medical Reversal (2015) and Malignant (2020).

Early life and education 

Prasad was raised in a suburb of Cleveland, Ohio, before moving outside of Chicago in northern Indiana. His parents immigrated from India. He attended Michigan State University, where he took courses in health care ethics and physiology. In 2005, Prasad graduated summa cum laude from MSU with a double major in philosophy and physiology. He gave the commencement speech to the College of Arts and Letters on behalf of the Philosophy Department. He completed his medical degree at University of Chicago in 2009 and completed a residency in internal medicine at Northwestern University in 2012. Prasad was certified in internal medicine by the American Board of Internal Medicine in 2012 and earned a Master's of Public Health from Johns Hopkins University in 2014. In 2015, Prasad completed a fellowship in oncology at the National Cancer Institute and hematology at the National Heart, Lung, and Blood Institute.

Career 

From 2015 to 2020, Prasad was assistant and then associate professor at the Oregon Health & Science University. He currently works at San Francisco General Hospital. Prasad is currently a full professor of a hematology-oncology at UCSF. He is a cancer drug and health policy researcher. He also studies the financial conflicts in drug approvals. In 2015, Prasad published the book, Ending Medical Reversal, with physician and academic Adam Cifu.

Prasad hosts the podcast Plenary Session and blogs at MedPage Today. Prasad has won several teaching awards, including the 2017 Craig Okada Award for best teacher in the Hematology Oncology Fellowship program, the 2018 faculty mentorship award from the internal medicine residency, the 2019 J. David Bristow award from the graduating medical students, and the 2020 excellence in research and scholarship mentoring as awarded by the internal medicine residents.

In the spring of 2020, Prasad published the book, Malignant: How Bad Policy and Bad Evidence Harm People with Cancer.

Views and reception 

In 2011, Prasad and colleagues published a research letter in the Archives of Internal Medicine. Charles Bankhead, a senior editor at MedPageToday, covered the topic, outlining the paper's primary point, which was the high prevalence of research articles demonstrating findings that deviated from the accepted standard of treatment at the time. Separately, "Retraction Watch" reported on Prasad's personal remarks about the paper, saying "For a long time, we were interested by what we believe to be a pervasive problem in modern medicine.  Namely, the spread of new technologies and therapies without clear evidence that they work, which are later (and often after considerable delay) followed by contradictions, which, in turn, after yet another delay, is followed by changes in practice and reimbursement." 

Matthew Hoffman, writing in 2012 for MedPageToday's KevinMD covered a paper by Prasad and colleagues on "When to abandon ship" when it comes to failing medical practices and treatments. Hoffman builds on the authors' proposed barriers to market entrance, such as evidence of effectiveness in large randomized controlled studies before broad usage, and links them to the insidious aspects of healthcare, such as profit and status. In 2013, Prasad and colleagues addressed the necessity for randomized controlled trials for the inferior vena cava filter (VCF) despite the intervention's bio-plausibility. The authors suggest that since the intervention has known adverse effects but an uncertain benefit, well-designed studies are necessary to shed light on the intervention's efficacy. The JAMA Internal Medicine article received widespread media attention, with Reuters Genevra Pittman interviewing Prasad about his further views on the intervention. According to the interview, Prasad advises against filter placement in all but the most extreme instances owing to a lack of proof and possibility for adverse events.

In 2013, Prasad's paper A Decade of Reversal:  An Analysis of 146 Contradicted Practices was published; The article was covered in a piece by The Huffington Post, which highlights a key lesson from the paper: patients should become more involved in their health care decisions rather than assuming a prescribed medication or device is beneficial. Patients may do this by asking their physician pertinent questions, such as what patient outcomes the intervention improved. Additionally, the article discusses the concept of healthcare cost. With growing anxiety about the expense of healthcare, utilizing limited resources on questionable medical practices with a weak evidence base threatens to jeopardize both the healthcare economy and patient health. Additionally, the authors of a Lancet Oncology editorial remark that "almost 10% of practice reversals occurred in oncology," suggesting that certain fields of medicine may be more susceptible to medical reversals than others.

Prasad has criticized other medical skeptics for their choices of topics to tackle, including homeopathy, as being poor use of their time. Skeptics David Gorski and Steven Novella published criticisms of and counter-arguments to Prasad's stance, pointing out the perils of not challenging alternative medicine during a pandemic.

Covid response
In October 2021, Prasad prompted social media controversy when he published a blog post comparing the U.S. COVID-19 pandemic response to the beginnings of Adolf Hitler's Third Reich. Bioethicist Arthur L. Caplan said that Prasad's arguments were specious and ignorant, and science historian Robert N. Proctor said that Prasad was "overplaying the dangers of vaccination mandates and trivializing the genuine harms to liberty posed by 1930s fascism".

In January 2022, the conservative periodical City Journal published an opinion piece by Prasad in which he attempted to demonstrate that the American public health organizations were not being honest in their response to the COVID-19 pandemic.  Writing for Science-Based Medicine, epidemiologist Lynn Shaffer criticized Prasad's article for the various "mistruths" it contained about face masks as a COVID-19 mitigation measure, for example the unevidenced claim that mask wearing was stunting children's language development. In Shaffer's view Prasad's writing "lean[s] heavily on pushing people's emotional hot buttons" and amounted to a form of fearmongering.

Prasad was an early member of the Urgency of Normal, a group that in 2022 campaigned against quarantines and mask mandates in schools during the COVID-19 pandemic. He spoke in support of repealing such mandates in a March 2022 interview.

Selected works

References

External links

Living people
Place of birth missing (living people)
Scientists from Cleveland
Scientists from Indiana
Scientists from Chicago
Michigan State University alumni
University of Chicago alumni
Johns Hopkins Bloomberg School of Public Health alumni
Oregon Health & Science University faculty
National Institutes of Health people
Northwestern University alumni
American people of Indian descent
American skeptics
American critics
21st-century American scientists
American hematologists
American oncologists
1982 births